The Yamaha X-1 is a commuter-style motorbike that is manufactured in Thailand. The motorbike is designed to compete with the 110 cc Honda Wave and the Suzuki Smash, a city commuter-style motorbike.

Motor
The  Yamaha X-1 is powered by a 2-valve, 4-stroke, 110 cc motorcycle. It is a low-RPM motor that uses air cooling. Designed to beat Honda Wave 125 in performance and fuel efficiency.

Statistics

See also
Honda Sonic 125
Yamaha X-1R

References

X-1